is a professional Japanese baseball player. He plays outfielder. He is a free agent. He previously played for the Orix Buffaloes and Chunichi Dragons.

On 30 June 2019, Takeda was traded along with Buffaloes teammate, Takahiro Matsuba to the Chunichi Dragons in exchange for Masato Matsui and Yusuke Matsui.

External links
 Takeda, Kengo, NPB.com

References

1994 births
Living people
People from Chikugo, Fukuoka
Baseball people from Fukuoka Prefecture
Japanese baseball players
Nippon Professional Baseball pitchers
Chunichi Dragons players
Orix Buffaloes players